The Dacian fortress of Ardan was a Dacian fortified town.

References
 Ștefan Dănilă. Consideraţii generale asupra cetăţii de pământ de la Ardan, în Arhiva Someşană, Năsăud, 3, 1975, p. 287-301, in Romanian.

Dacian fortresses in Bistrița-Năsăud County
Historic monuments in Bistrița-Năsăud County
Ancient history of Transylvania